Rodrigo y Gabriela is the second studio album by Mexican musical duo Rodrigo y Gabriela. It was first released in Ireland on February 17, 2006, where it debuted at number one on the Irish Albums Chart. The album included covers of Led Zeppelin's "Stairway to Heaven" and Metallica's "Orion", two artists who the duo say influenced their music.

Their album was subsequently certified platinum in Ireland.

The Japanese version of the album has an extra track, named "Señorita Xxx".

Track listing

Personnel
Rodrigo y Gabriela
Rodrigo Sánchez – acoustic guitar
Gabriela Quintero – acoustic guitar

Additional performer
Roby Lakatos – violin on "Ixtapa"

Production and design
Produced by John Leckie and Rodrigo y Gabriela
Mixed by John Leckie
Assistant engineering by Tom Dalgety and Rick Levy
Mastered by Robyn Robins
Pre-production assistance by Graham Higgins and Negra Modelo
Album Cover Photography Carlo Polli
Photography – Kris Janis Berzins
Additional photos – Colin Malakie, Carlo Polli, Rodrigo, Tina Korhonen, Roger Woolman, Alan Maguire
Front cover image – Digital Vision/Getty Images
Album design – Dara Ní Bheacháin

Charts

References

Rodrigo y Gabriela albums
2006 albums
Albums produced by John Leckie